Prays caenobitella is a moth in the  family Plutellidae.

External links
 Prays caenobitella at www.catalogueoflife.org.

Plutellidae
Moths described in 1816